Space Invaders: Invasion Day, known as Space Raiders in North America, is a 2002 third-person shooter video game developed by Taito, a remake of the original 1978 Space Invaders arcade game from its creators. Re-imagined for the sixth generation home consoles, Space Invaders: Invasion Day takes the surface-to-air shooting action of the original title and puts it into a third-person urban street setting on the GameCube (Japan and North America) and PlayStation 2 (the latter only in Japan and Europe). This update features detailed opening cinematics of the alien invasion, story and survival modes, boss battles and three playable characters, each with their own backstory.

Gameplay
The playable characters include Justin (street teen), Ashley (fashion photographer) and Naji (police officer), and while they look different, all three play similarly. From a fixed height behind the character the player directs them to shoot at increasingly large waves of various aliens as they march down the street toward the character's position. Characters can move side-to-side as in the original arcade game, but also have limited movement both into and away from the screen.

Occasional power-ups become available giving the player temporary access to special weapons. Strategic use of power-ups is required as the variety of aliens and diversity of their attacks will not allow for the straight forward shooting of the original arcade game. The game contains six missions and can be completed in under two hours. A port of the original Space Invaders arcade game is included and unlocked by a cheat.

Reception

Space Invaders: Invasion Day received generally negative reviews, earning a score of 40 out of 100 from Metacritic. Criticisms included poor graphics, repetitive gameplay and infidelity to Space Invaders. ScrewAttack named it the worst remake or reboot in video gaming because of its radical, unsuccessful departure from the original Space Invaders franchise.

References

External links
 
 

2002 video games
Alien invasions in video games
GameCube games
PlayStation 2 games
Raiders
Third-person shooters
Video games about police officers
Video games developed in Japan
Video games featuring black protagonists
Video games featuring female protagonists
Video game reboots
Video game remakes
Single-player video games
Taito games
Sammy games
Mastiff (company) games